Al-Yarmouk Sports Club is a Syrian women's professional basketball club based in Aleppo. The club is part of the sports and scouting organization Homenetmen.

Honours
Syrian Women Basketball League
Runners-up (1): 2009
Syrian Women Basketball League 2
Fourth place (1): 2021

References

External links
Official page

Basketball teams in Syria
Sport in Aleppo
Basketball teams established in 1925
Sport in Syria